St Francis Hospital (Bulawayo) is a public health institution that provides health services to the community of Zimbabwe in the second largest capital city Bulawayo, in Matebeleland.

See also 
 List of hospitals in Zimbabwe

References 

Buildings and structures in Bulawayo
Hospitals in Zimbabwe